Esa Holopainen (born 1 October 1972) is a Finnish musician, currently the main songwriter, occasional lyricist, founding member and lead guitarist of the Finnish metal band Amorphis. 
He is one out the two longest standing members of the band (the other being Tomi Koivusaari) and one of the four original members in the band (the others being Jan Rechberger, Tomi Koivusaari and Olli-Pekka Laine).

He was also formerly the guitarist of the bands Violent Solution (1990) and Chaosbreed (2003–2004).

Holopainen did the guitar solo on "Dambuster" from Hellroad Caravan by Mannhai.

His influences include Ritchie Blackmore, David Gilmour, John McLaughlin and Petri Walli of Kingston Wall. Holopainen uses ESP guitars and Koch amplifiers.

Discography

With Violent Solution
 Period of Depression (demo, 1990)
 Paralysis / Individual Nightmare (EP, 1990)

Solo
 Silver Lake by Esa Holopainen (album, 2021)

With Amorphis
 Disment of Soul (demo, 1991)
 Amorphis  (single, 1992)
 The Karelian Isthmus (album, 1992)
 Privilege of Evil (EP, 1993)
 Tales from the Thousand Lakes (album, 1994)
 Black Winter Day / Fear (split with Gorefest, 1995)
 Black Winter Day (EP, 1995)
 Elegy (album, 1996)
 My Kantele (EP, 1997)
 Divinity / Northern Lights (single, 1999)
 Tuonela (album, 1999)
 Alone (single, 2001)
 Am Universum (album, 2001)
 Mourning Soil (single, 2003)
 Far from the Sun (EP, 2003)
 Day of Your Beliefs (single, 2003)
 Far from the Sun (album, 2003)
 Evil Inside (single, 2003)
 Relapse Singles Series Vol. 4 (split with Goreaphobia, Phobia, and Exit-13, 2004)
 House of Sleep (single, 2006)
 Eclipse (album, 2006)
 The Smoke (single, 2006)
 Silent Waters (single, 2007)
 Silent Waters (album, 2007)
 Silver Bride (single, 2009)
 Skyforger (album, 2009)
 From the Heaven of My Heart (single, 2009)
 Martyr of the Free Word / From the Heaven of My Heart (split with Epica, 2009)
 Forging the Land of Thousand Lakes (DVD, 2010)
 Magic & Mayhem - Tales from the Early Years (compilation, 2010)
 You I Need (single, 2011)
 The Beginning of Times (album, 2011)
 Circle (album, 2013)
 Under the Red Cloud (album, 2015)
 Queen of Time (album, 2018)
 Halo (album, 2022)

With Chaosbreed
 Unleashed Carnage (EP, 2003)
 Brutal (album, 2004)

References

1972 births
Living people
Amorphis members
Finnish heavy metal guitarists
Finnish heavy metal musicians
Lead guitarists
Sitar players
21st-century guitarists